Cheirodon dialepturus is a species of fish in the family Characidae.

Description
It has an elongate, compressed body. It has 32–34 vertebrae and is of a pale brown colour with a bronze-green shading and some conspicuous black scales at the back.

Distribution
In Pacific drainages from Costa Rica to Panama and Colombia.

See also
Cheirodon mitopterus

References

External links
ZipcodeZoo entry
Fishwise entry

dialepturus
Taxa named by William Lee Fink
Taxa named by Stanley Howard Weitzman
Fish described in 1974